Iran Marine Fund (IMF) is a state-owned enterprise of the Ministry of Industry, Mines and Trade of The Islamic Republic of Iran that works to convert the country's marine capacities into sustainable national interests.

The fund was established to enable sustainable development in Iran's marine industry. It acts as an interface between the government and the private sector, while also providing developmental and strategic support. The Marine Industries Development Fund was established by Article 1 of the Marine Industries Development and Support Law, approved on 5 August 2008, by the Islamic Consultative Assembly. The Fund was approved by the Council of Ministers on 2 July 2010.

Objectives  
The Fund objectives are to achieve sustainable development in the marine industry: interpretation, regulation and implementation of support to the marine industries in areas such as construction, repair, supply chain development and service and facilitation in solving problems and resolving deterrent factors that may hinder development.

The Fund requires the use of standard methods and procedures. It seeks to deliver time and cost-effective services, proper management of resources and attract domestic and international resources.

Tasks
The Fund undertakes:
 Planning
 Financial support
 Preferential tariff subsidizing domestic manufacturers that have won international tenders while maximizing use of native technical, engineering, production, industrial and executive forces
 Support for domestic shipbuilders directly and by assisting applicants who purchase locally-built vessels 
 Subsidies for domestic manufacturers by covering part of unforeseen cost increases for materials and equipment for ship/marine construction
 Subsidies to compensate for delays as a result of using ships from domestic manufacturers;
 Subsidies equivalent to applicant income tax paid by domestic standards-compliant vessel owners 
 Subsidies equivalent to applicant income tax for ship repair in domestic yards for Iran-flagged ships

Mission

Marine Industries Development Fund mission

Fund mission 

Facilitate the achievement of sustainable marine development through providing credit, technical and software assistance, investment and developmental research.

Policies 

 Support ship construction/repair and marine industries
 Secure supply chain
 Reduce investment risks 
 Support coastal development and water accessibility
 Expand transit and re-export
 International partnerships
 Develop exports
 Encourage standards compliance
 Develop marine insurance
 Participate in offshore industries.
 Support private and public sector needs

Article 1 of Marine Industries Development and Support Law 
The government was permitted to establish the Marine Industries Development Fund (hereinafter referred to as "Fund") with initial capital of four hundred billion rials (Rls.400,000,000,000), in order to study, define, regulate and enforce support of the Marine Industries (manufacturing, production, repair and maintenance of various types of surface, surface effect and submersible vessels and offshore industry), and solve the problems and deterrents factors in compliance with environmental considerations, as stated in the statute.

See also
Economy of Iran
Industry of Iran

References

External links 
 
 International Maritime Organization 

2010 establishments in Iran
Finance in Iran
Financial services companies of Iran
Ministry of Industry, Mine and Trade (Iran)